The Bush House is a historic house in Grove Hill, Alabama.  The two-story Colonial Revival style house was built in 1912.  It was added to the National Register of Historic Places on July 28, 1999.  It was listed due to its architectural significance as a part of the Clark County Multiple Property Submission.

References

External links

National Register of Historic Places in Clarke County, Alabama
Houses on the National Register of Historic Places in Alabama
Colonial Revival architecture in Alabama
Houses completed in 1912
Houses in Clarke County, Alabama
1912 establishments in Alabama